Rick Cole (born 1953) is the executive director of the Congress for the New Urbanism and an advisor to the mayor of Pasadena, California. He has been the city manager of Azusa, California, then Ventura, California (2004–2012), and Santa Monica, California (2015–2020). He currently is the Chief Deputy Controller of Los Angeles.

Career 

Cole is a graduate of Occidental College and the Columbia University Graduate School of Journalism.

He served 12 years in elective office in his hometown of Pasadena, California, including as deputy mayor from 1990 to 1992 and as mayor of Pasadena from 1992 to 1994.  He co-founded the newspaper Pasadena Weekly. At one point, he was marketing director of West Hollywood.

Cole was named city manager of Ventura on a 5-2 vote in 2004. While serving in that position, he was in the running for – but failed to become – the city manager position in Austin, Texas. His forced resignation from the position in 2012 was accepted by a 4-3 vote.

He became the parish administrator at the San Buenaventura Mission in 2012. In July, 2013, Los Angeles mayor Eric Garcetti appointed Cole to the position of deputy mayor for Budget and Innovation. On May 27, 2015, Cole was named the city manager of Santa Monica, by unanimous vote of the city council. Cole served as the city manager from 2015 until his resignation on April 17, 2020. He left office after an online petition for his resignation attained more than 2,800 signatures on change.org, an online petitioning service. His resignation was announced on the City of Santa Monica's official blog eighteen days before the local city council was scheduled to vote on large budget cuts to compensate for financial shortfalls. The shortfalls, attributed primarily to the 2019-2020 coronavirus pandemic during which the city closed all bars and restaurants, had already amounted to $72 millions and were projected to include an additional $154 million in the year to come. The petition's authors cited alleged "superfluous spending [and] poor judgment", including "expanded powers and authority under the local emergency proclamation" which allowed the city manager to "layoff a large percentage of City Staff without giving them proper notice". The petition also called for the resignation of Assistant City Manager Katie Lichtig.

In 2021, he was named the executive director of the Congress for the New Urbanism, a nonprofit 501(c)(3) organization. He also took on the role of special housing advisor to Victor Gordo, the mayor of Pasadena, California.

On December 1, 2022, City Controller-elect Kenneth Mejia appointed Cole to serve as Chief Deputy City Controller for his term. Cole previously endorsed Mejia for his City Controller election.

Recognition
In 2006, he was selected as one of Governing Magazine'''s nine "Public Officials of the Year", noting his “urban revival skills”.

On his resignation, the Ventura County Star'' editorialized that Cole had "led a downtown revitalization, guided Ventura through daunting budget challenges and oversaw important but unsexy work such as improving public works, water and sewer operations."

References

External links
 
 

1953 births
Living people
Mayors of Pasadena, California